Arcadia Machine & Tool, commonly abbreviated to AMT, was a firearms manufacturer from Irwindale, California.  The company produced several weapons, primarily clones of existing firearms, but made from stainless steel rather than the standard steel used for most firearms of the time.

AMT was described by the US Bureau of Alcohol, Tobacco, Firearms and Explosives (ATF) as one of the "Ring of Fire companies", which were known for large-scale manufacture of Saturday night specials. The company filed for bankruptcy after their products were affected by quality and reliability problems, and the assets and trademark were acquired by Irwindale Arms Incorporated (IAI). Later, in 1998, Galena Industries of Sturgis, South Dakota, purchased the company and produced firearms in the style of AMT's until 2001 when Crusader Gun Company (later High Standard Manufacturing Company) of Houston, Texas purchased it.

Products

Pistols
Auto Mag
AMT Baby AutoMag
AMT AutoMag II
AMT AutoMag III
AMT AutoMag IV
AMT AutoMag V
AMT AutoMag 440
AMT Backup
AMT Hardballer
AMT On Duty
AMT Lightning pistol

Rifles
AMT Lightning 25/22
AMT Magnum Hunter

See also
Davis Industries
Jimenez Arms
Lorcin Engineering Company
Phoenix Arms
Raven Arms
Sundance Industries

References

External links 
 Automag Parts
 A website about all of the AMT pistols

Defunct firearms manufacturers
Firearm manufacturers of the United States
Irwindale, California
Manufacturing companies established in 1977
1977 establishments in California
Defunct manufacturing companies based in Greater Los Angeles